Saint James District is a national historic district located at St. James in Smithtown Town, Suffolk County, New York.  The district includes 21 contributing buildings, two contributing sites, and one contributing structure.  Prominent buildings within the district are the Timothy Smith House (ca. 1800) and dependencies, "Deepwells" (1845–47) and dependencies, St. James Episcopal Church and dependencies, the St. James Railroad Station (built in 1873), and St. James General Store (built in 1857). The newest structure, the 1922-built Saint James Fire Department was also included in the district, but was modernized in recent decades.

It was added to the National Register of Historic Places in 1973.

Image gallery

References

External links
Saint James Episcopal Church (Our History)
St. James General Store (Suffolk County Department of Parks)
Deepwells Farm (Suffolk County Department of Parks)
Saint James Fire District

Historic districts on the National Register of Historic Places in New York (state)
Gothic Revival architecture in New York (state)
Historic districts in Suffolk County, New York
National Register of Historic Places in Suffolk County, New York